The 36th parallel north is a circle of latitude that is 36 degrees north of the Earth's equatorial plane. It crosses Africa, the Mediterranean Sea, Asia, the Pacific Ocean, North America and the Atlantic Ocean. In the ancient Mediterranean world, its role for navigation and geography was similar to that played by the Equator today.

From 7 April 1991 to 31 December 1996, the parallel defined the limit of the northern no-fly zone in Iraq.

At this latitude the sun is visible for 14 hours, 36 minutes during the summer solstice and 9 hours, 43 minutes during the winter solstice.

Around the world
Starting at the Prime Meridian and heading eastwards, the parallel 36° north passes through:

{| class="wikitable plainrowheaders"
! scope="col" width="125" | Co-ordinates
! scope="col" | Country, territory or sea
! scope="col" | Notes
|-
| style="background:#b0e0e6;" | 
! scope="row" style="background:#b0e0e6;" | Mediterranean Sea
| style="background:#b0e0e6;" |
|-
| 
! scope="row" | 
| Passing through Mostaganem
|-
| 
! scope="row" | 
|
|-valign="top"
| style="background:#b0e0e6;" | 
! scope="row" style="background:#b0e0e6;" | Mediterranean Sea
| style="background:#b0e0e6;" | Passing just north of the island of Linosa,  Passing between the islands of Comino and Malta, 
|-valign="top"
| style="background:#b0e0e6;" | 
! scope="row" style="background:#b0e0e6;" | Aegean Sea
| style="background:#b0e0e6;" | Passing between the islands of Kythira and Antikythera,  Passing just north of Saria Island, 
|-
| 
! scope="row" | 
| Island of Rhodes
|-
| style="background:#b0e0e6;" | 
! scope="row" style="background:#b0e0e6;" | Mediterranean Sea
| style="background:#b0e0e6;" |
|-
| 
! scope="row" | 
| Hatay Province
|-
| 
! scope="row" | 
| Passing just north of Raqqa
|-
| 
! scope="row" | 
|
|-
| 
! scope="row" | 
|
|-
| 
! scope="row" | 
|
|-
| 
! scope="row" | 
|
|-valign="top"
| 
! scope="row" | 
| Khyber Pakhtunkhwa Gilgit-Baltistan - claimed by 
|-
| 
! scope="row" | Shaksgam Valley
|-valign="top"
| 
! scope="row" | 
| Xinjiang Tibet Qinghai Gansu — passing just south of Lanzhou  Ningxia Gansu Shaanxi Shanxi Henan Shandong Henan (for about ) Shandong — passing just south of Qingdao
|-
| style="background:#b0e0e6;" | 
! scope="row" style="background:#b0e0e6;" | Yellow Sea
| style="background:#b0e0e6;" |
|-
| 
! scope="row" | 
|South Chungcheong Province - North Jeolla Province Border, Passing just north of Gunsan, Iksan North Jeolla Province-North Chungcheong Province-North Gyeongsang Province BorderNorth Gyeongsang Province - Passing just south of Gumipassing just north of Daegu-Palgong Mountain  North Gyeongsang Province- Passing through Pohang
|-
| style="background:#b0e0e6;" | 
! scope="row" style="background:#b0e0e6;" | Sea of Japan
| style="background:#b0e0e6;" |
|-valign="top"
| 
! scope="row" | 
| Island of Chiburi-shima: — Shimane Prefecture
|-
| style="background:#b0e0e6;" | 
! scope="row" style="background:#b0e0e6;" | Sea of Japan
| style="background:#b0e0e6;" |
|-valign="top"
| 
! scope="row" | 
| Island of Honshū: — Fukui Prefecture— Gifu Prefecture— Nagano Prefecture— Gunma Prefecture − for about — Saitama Prefecture— Chiba Prefecture − for about — Ibaraki Prefecture
|-
| style="background:#b0e0e6;" | 
! scope="row" style="background:#b0e0e6;" | Pacific Ocean
| style="background:#b0e0e6;" |
|-valign="top"
| 
! scope="row" | 
| California Nevada Arizona New Mexico Texas Oklahoma Arkansas Missouri / Arkansas border (approximate) Tennessee North Carolina (Madison County, for about ) Tennessee (Unicoi County, for about ) North Carolina
|-
| style="background:#b0e0e6;" | 
! scope="row" style="background:#b0e0e6;" | Atlantic Ocean
| style="background:#b0e0e6;" |
|-valign="top"
| style="background:#b0e0e6;" | 
! scope="row" style="background:#b0e0e6;" | Strait of Gibraltar
|-
| style="background:#b0e0e6;" | 
! scope="row" style="background:#b0e0e6;" | Mediterranean Sea
| style="background:#b0e0e6;" |
|}

United States

In the United States, the 36th parallel north is occasionally used as a rough northern boundary for the Sun Belt, a region spanning most Southern and Southwestern states and comprising most of the nation's warmest climates.

Cities and landmarks close to the parallel include the following: Kettleman City, California; Henderson, Nevada; Hoover Dam; South Rim of the Grand Canyon; Los Alamos National Laboratory; Tulsa, Oklahoma (passing through the southern portion of the city); Nashville, Tennessee (passing through the southern portion of the city); Knoxville, Tennessee; Winston-Salem, North Carolina; High Point, North Carolina; Greensboro, North Carolina; Durham, North Carolina; Chapel Hill, North Carolina; and others. The parallel helped define the North Carolina–Tennessee–Virginia Corners.

The sixth standard parallel south of Mount Diablo Range at 35°48′ north, 13.8344 miles south of the 36th parallel, forms a continuous boundary between the California counties of
Monterey,
Kings,
Tulare, and
Inyo
on the north and the counties of
San Luis Obispo,
Kern, and San Bernardino
on the south. It is sometimes taken as the boundary between Central California and Southern California.

The parallel 36° north approximately forms the southernmost boundary of the Missouri Bootheel with the State of Arkansas.

The 36th parallel passes through Duke University in several places.  Its Campus Drive that connects the campuses crosses the parallel several times.  The Duke Gardens has a "36th Parallel Club" although the garden itself is just north of the parallel.

References

See also
35th parallel north
Parallel 36°30′ north
37th parallel north

n36
Borders of Missouri
Borders of Arkansas